Basiothia schenki, the brown striped hawk, is a moth of the family Sphingidae. The species was first described by Heinrich Benno Möschler in 1872. It is known from Zimbabwe and South Africa.

It has a close plant-pollinator relationship with Disa cooperi, whose scent attracts only two hawkmoth species, Basiothia schenki and Agrius convolvuli, that can effectively pollinate its flower. The moths' proboscis length and the orchid's spur length align perfectly with its petals and position of the pollinaria and stigma, although B. schenki has a shorter proboscis than A. convolvuli and must fly almost up to the flower and press against it. Adults are also pollinators of Satyrium longicauda and Zaluzianskya natalensis.

The larvae feed on Vernonia species.

References

Basiothia
Moths described in 1872
Lepidoptera of the Democratic Republic of the Congo
Lepidoptera of South Africa
Lepidoptera of Zimbabwe
Moths of Sub-Saharan Africa